William Paul Schaefer (9 October 1925 – 20 July 2003) was a New Zealand field hockey player. He represented New Zealand in field hockey between 1956 and 1964, including at the 1956, 1960 and 1964 Olympic Games.

References

External links

1925 births
2003 deaths
Sportspeople from Masterton
New Zealand male field hockey players
Olympic field hockey players of New Zealand
Field hockey players at the 1956 Summer Olympics
Field hockey players at the 1960 Summer Olympics
Field hockey players at the 1964 Summer Olympics
Male field hockey goalkeepers